The 1920 municipal election was held December 13, 1920, to elect a mayor and six aldermen to sit on Edmonton City Council and three trustees to sit on the public school board. J Cormack, Joseph Gariépy and J J Murray were acclaimed to two-year terms on the separate school board. In the election's only plebiscite, Edmontonians rejected a proposal to pay their aldermen for the second consecutive election.

There were ten aldermen on city council, but four of the positions were already filled: Percy Abbott, John Bowen, James East and Rice Sheppard were all elected to two-year terms in 1919 and were still in office. J. A. Kinney had also been elected to a two-year term in 1919, but had resigned. Accordingly, Samuel McCoppen was elected to a one-year term.

There were seven trustees on the public school board, but four of the positions were already filled: Samuel Barnes, J. W. H. Williams, J A McPherson, and Frank Scott had all been elected to two-year terms in 1919 and were still in office. The same was true on the separate board, where Joseph Henri Picard, Paul Jenvrin, Thomas Magee, and Thomas Malone were continuing.

Voter turnout
There were 14,710 ballots cast out of 26,903 eligible voters, for a voter turnout of 54.6%.

Results
 bold indicates elected
 italics indicate incumbent
 South Side, where data is available, indicates representative for Edmonton's South Side, with a minimum South Side representation instituted after the city of Strathcona, south of the North Saskatchewan River, amalgamated into Edmonton on February 1, 1912.

Mayor

Aldermen

Public school trustees
Multiple non-transferable voting was used - each voter cast up to three votes.

Separate (Catholic) school trustees

Plebiscite

References
Election History, City of Edmonton: Elections and Census Office

1920
1920 elections in Canada
1920 in Alberta
December 1920 events in Canada
1920s in Edmonton